The Inebriates Act 1898 was an Act of the Parliament of the United Kingdom, which came into force in 1898. The Inebriates Act 1898 was directly due to the Jane Cakebread case.

It allowed non-criminal inebriates to be admitted to reformatories for up to three years if they had been convicted of drunkenness four times in one year. Criminal inebriates were also included if they had been convicted of an imprisonable crime.

State inebriate reformatories could be established by the Secretary of State paid for by the Government. Certified inebriate reformatories satisfying the certification process of the Secretary of State could be created on the application of the council of any county or borough or of any persons desirous of establishing an inebriate reformatory.

The Habitual Drunkards Act 1879 had allowed authorities to establish retreats for inebriates but payment by the inmate was required, thus excluding those working-class drunkards most at risk and with the least financial support.

A year after the Inebriate Act's passage, the Journal of Mental Science viewed the results as disappointing in part due to lack of funding, with no reformatories at all in Scotland or Ireland and with those in England insufficient to meet demand. The immediate need for a reformatory for men was noted.

As of December 1900, no state reformatories were built and councils did not fund any. Some councils made use of privately owned homes, such as Brentry, near Bristol, Duxhurst, near Reigate, and St Joseph's Reformatory at Ashford, Kent. A review of the Act reported "During the first year’s working of the new Act, only eighty-two patients were received, five under Section 1, upon conviction for an offence punishable by imprisonment or penal servitude; and seventy-two under Section 2, on a new conviction, after three previous convictions within a year, of an habitual drunkard. Of these, London has supplied sixty-one cases."

By 1904, women accounted for 91% of those in inebriate retreats while accounting for 20% of convictions for drunkenness. Out of the 3636 compulsory admissions between 1899 and 1910, 84% were women. By 1906, nine of the eleven reformatories in England were exclusively for women, with the other two having space for both genders.

The act was superseded by the Mental Deficiency Act 1913, reclassifying many inebriates as mental defectives. The last inebriate reformatories closed by the 1920s, though many were reclassified and operated as mental institutions.

References

United Kingdom Acts of Parliament 1898
Mental health legal history of the United Kingdom
Alcohol law in the United Kingdom